Wrestling competitions at the 2014 Commonwealth Games in Glasgow, Scotland were held between 29 July and 31 July at the Scottish Exhibition and Conference Centre. Greco-Roman wrestling was dropped from the program.

Medal summary

Medal table

Men's freestyle

Women's freestyle

* Only one bronze was awarded in the women's 75 kg event as only five wrestlers competed.

Schedule
All times are British Summer Time (UTC+1). All event times are subject to change.

Participating nations

References

External links
Official results book – Wrestling

 
2014 in sport wrestling
2014
2014 Commonwealth Games events
Wrestling in Scotland
Wrestling